Paul McLean (born 1 January 1965) is a former Australian rules footballer who played 1 game for Fitzroy in the Victorian Football League (VFL) in 1987.  He was recruited by Fitzroy from Melbourne during the 1986 season.

He is the brother of Glenn McLean, who played for Melbourne and Collingwood, and the son of Tom McLean, who played for Melbourne and North Melbourne.

Notes

External links 		
		
Profile on Demonwiki
		
		
		
		
		
1965 births
Living people
Australian rules footballers from Victoria (Australia)	
Fitzroy Football Club players	
Sandringham Football Club players